The 2006 Sundance Film Festival was held in Utah from January 20 to 30, 2005. It was held in Park City, with screenings in Salt Lake City; Ogden; and the Sundance Resort. It was the 21st iteration of the Sundance Film Festival.

Award winners

Juries
The juries at the Sundance Film Festival are responsible for determining the Jury Prize winners in each category and to award Special Jury Prizes as they see fit.

US Documentary competition: Stacy Peralta, Jehane Noujaim, Steve James, Jean-Philippe Boucicaut, Gail Dolgin
US Dramatic competition: Chris Eyre, Vera Farmiga, John C. Reilly, B. Ruby Rich, Christine Vachon
World Documentary competition: Penny Woolcock, Jean Perret, Miriam Cutler
World Dramatic competition: Antonia Bird, Mike Goodridge, Fernando León de Aranoa
Shorts Competition: Sam Green, Ernest Hardy
Alfred P. Sloan Feature Film Prize: Peggy LeMone, Shane Carruth, John Underkoffler, Lawrence Krauss, Miguel Arteta

Film selections

Independent Film Competition: Documentary

Independent Film Competition: Dramatic

World Cinema Competition: Documentary

World Cinema Competition: Dramatic

Premieres

Special Screenings

American Spectrum

Park City at Midnight

Frontier

Online

Sundance Collection

Short films

US Dramatic

US Documentary

US Animated

International Dramatic

International Documentary

International Animated

References

2005
2005 in Utah
2005 film festivals
2005 in American cinema
2005 festivals in the United States
January 2005 events in the United States